The Peretna is a river in Okulovsky District of Novgorod Oblast, Russia. It is left tributary of the Msta. The town of Okulovka and the work settlement of Kulotino are located on the banks of the Peretna.

The source of the Peretna is in Lake Zaozyorye, west of the town of Okulovka. The river flows northeast and has its mouth in the village of Toporok. It crosses the railway line connecting Moscow and Saint Petersburg between the source and Okulovka.

References

Rivers of Novgorod Oblast